Jeffrey Paul Fulchino (born November 26, 1979) is an American former professional baseball pitcher.

Career

Florida Marlins

His major league debut was on June 22, 2006, against the Baltimore Orioles. He pitched 1/3 of an inning and allowed 0 runs with one walk. Fulchino spent  playing for the Albuquerque Isotopes, the Marlins Triple-A affiliate.

Kansas City Royals

In February , Fulchino signed a minor league contract with the Kansas City Royals.
On June 8, 2008, Fulchino was called up to replace the struggling Joel Peralta.

Houston Astros

On December 8, 2008, Fulchino was claimed off waivers by the Houston Astros.

During his 2009 season, Jeff was described as the Houston Astros 2nd most valuable pitcher. He threw 81 innings over 62 games; striking out 71 batters and boasting an ERA of 3.40. Jeff continued his success in the 2010 season. After battling mid-season injury, Fulchino lowered his season ERA to 5.65. As of August 20, 2010, Fulchino posted an ERA of 2.13 in his last 10 appearances.

San Diego Padres
He elected free agency on October 20, 2011, after spending the season with the San Diego Padres.

Washington Nationals
On December 16, he signed a split contract with the Washington Nationals.

Bridgeport Bluefish

Jeff pitched for the Bridgeport Bluefish of the Atlantic League of Professional Baseball. He was named to the 2013 Atlantic League All Star team. Fulchino was named the closer for Willie Upshaw's Bridgeport Bluefish.

Post-baseball career
After retiring from baseball, Fulchino became a real estate agent in Monroe, Connecticut.

References

External links

1979 births
Living people
People from Titusville, Florida
Baseball players from Florida
Major League Baseball pitchers
Florida Marlins players
Kansas City Royals players
Houston Astros players
San Diego Padres players
Albuquerque Isotopes players
UConn Huskies baseball players
Utica Blue Sox players
Kane County Cougars players
Greensboro Bats players
Jupiter Hammerheads players
Carolina Mudcats players
Omaha Royals players
Northwest Arkansas Naturals players
Round Rock Express players
Oklahoma City RedHawks players
Bridgeport Bluefish players